Pseudagrion inconspicuum is a species of damselfly in the family Coenagrionidae. It is found in Angola, the Democratic Republic of the Congo, Malawi, South Africa, Zambia, and possibly Tanzania. Its natural habitats are subtropical or tropical high-altitude grassland, rivers, and swamps.

References

Coenagrionidae
Insects described in 1931
Taxonomy articles created by Polbot